Charles Christian Waterstreet (born 17 July 1950) is an Australian former barrister, author, and theatre and film producer. He has written two memoirs and produced two films, and he is now a columnist for The Sydney Morning Herald after the NSW Bar Association cancelled his practising certificate. He is known as one of the co-creators of the ABC Television series Rake. However, co-creator and actor Richard Roxburgh asserted in 2017 that Waterstreet had only contributed one idea to a single episode.

Early life and education
 and the University of Sydney where he earned a Bachelor of Arts in English, History and Political Science in 1971, and a Bachelor of Laws in 1974. During his time at university, he resided at St John's College and later at St Andrew's College.

Career

Legal career
Waterstreet began his career teaching public law at the University of New South Wales from 1974 to 1978. In 1974, he was admitted to the bar and practised part-time, defending people charged with protest and homosexuality offences. He practised as a barrister, mainly in criminal law, at Forbes Chambers in Sydney until July 2016.

Arts career
Waterstreet is a theatre and film producer. In 1986, he produced Howling III and in 1990 he produced Blood Oath. Along with Richard Roxburgh and Peter Duncan, he is a co-creator of the ABC TV series Rake. In 2019, Council of The New South Wales Bar Association cancelled his Practising Certificate finding that his actions resulted in Unsatisfactory Professional Conduct.

He began a theatrical career in producing the hit Boys Own  with Grahame Bond (Aunty Jack) from 1979 which ran for nearly three years; it played in Los Angeles with an all-Australian cast. In film he co-produced The Marsupials – The Howling III with director Philippe Mora. In 1990 he produced the highly respected Blood Oath which starred Bryan Brown, Russell Crowe and Deborah Kara Unger. The film was successfully released in Japanese theatres in April 1991 and in the United States in June of that year. It was shown at the celebrations to mark the 50th anniversary of the Geneva Convention on 12 August 1999 in Moscow to highlight aspects of international humanitarian law.

Waterstreet has been a member of the Aspen FilmFest Advisory Committee since 1993. In 1996, he produced Next to Nothing with TCN9 and Mushroom Pictures.

He is the author of Precious Bodily Fluids: A Larrikin's Memoir (Hodder Headline Australia and UK, 1998), which was re-issued by Hachette in 2008 as an Australian classic, and its sequel, Repeating the Leaving (Hodder Headline Australia, 2001). He is currently writing his third autobiography, Rake Man.

Waterstreet's legal publications include:
 "Tricks of Memory" – for the Medico-Legal Society of New South Wales, 12 June 1996
 "Inner child is at the mercy of the memory 'therapists'" – review of Richard Guilliatt's book, Talk of the Devil – The Sydney Morning Herald, 2 November 1996
 "Down False Memory Lane – Aspects of Current Law in New South Wales" – Crown Prosecutor's Annual Conference, 15 April 1998
 "Recovered Memory Syndrome – Remembrance of Things Past" – LAAMS Seminar: States of Mind: Forensic Psychiatry & Psychology for Family & Criminal Lawyers, 1 July 1998
 Law for the Public (contributor) – published by Penguin

He is also a regular columnist for The Sun-Herald where he has a weekly feature article in the "Extra" section named "Waterstreetlife". On 12 May 2013 he published an article in the Sydney Morning Herald titled "A Mother's Tale of Heartache", in which he argued that a man convicted of being a ringleader in the gang rapes of seven under-age girls and women in Sydney in 2000 should be released early because of his ethnic background. He was widely condemned for this.

Newcastle artist Nigel Milsom won his first Archibald Prize in 2015 for his portrait of Charles Waterstreet, the artist's former defence lawyer.

Personal life
Waterstreet was married to a woman called Fiona and they had a son, Harry.  Both now live in the US and Waterstreet maintains contact with them. Waterstreet had been romantically linked to actress Kate Fitzpatrick. He also dated journalist Gretel Killeen for a short time, and the two remain close friends.

In October 2017, Waterstreet was accused of sexually harassing law student Tina Ni Huang during a job interview in August 2017. He has since denied these accusations.

Notable cases
Over the course of his career, Waterstreet has appeared as counsel in many high-profile criminal and civil cases in all courts in New South Wales, as well as the High Court of Australia, including social security, murder, drug, sexual assault, false memory and terrorism trials. He has also appeared in cases in Victoria, Tasmania, Queensland, the Australian Capital Territory and Vanuatu at various times in his career. Some of his more prominent cases include:
 R v Barton (1978)
 The Greek Social Security Case (1978–1982)
 R v Miller (1983) (prosecutor) 
 R v English (1987)
 R v Adam (1999)
 O'Halloran v The Queen (2001, HCA)
 Chung v The Queen (2001, HCA)
 Glossop v The Queen (2002, HCA)
 R v El-Azzi (2004)
 R v Baladjam & Ors (2008–09)
 Lange v Back & Schwartz (2009)
 Jedah Jodeh v The Queen (2011)
 R v Michael Anthony Ryan (2012)
 R v Khazaal (2012, HCA)
 R v Rogerson & McNamara (2015)
 R v Murphy (aka The Wolf) (2016–18)
 R v Amati (2018)

References

External links

1950 births
Australian barristers
Australian film producers
Australian theatre managers and producers
Australian writers
Living people
People from Albury, New South Wales
Sydney Law School alumni
University of Sydney alumni